This is a list of the Poland national football team results since 1921 to 1939.

Between their first match in 1920 and 1939, when competitive football stopped for the Second World War, Poland played in 83 matches, resulting in 30 victories, 17 draws and 36 defeats.

1920s

1921

1922

1923

1924

1925

1926

1927

1928

1930s

1930

1931

1932

1933

1934

1935

1936

1937

1938

1939

Notes

See also
Poland national football team

References

Poland national football team
1921 in Polish football
1922 in Polish sport
1923 in Polish sport
National association football team results